The First Congregational Church of Ovid is a religious building in Ovid, Michigan.  It was designated a Michigan State Historic Site in 1971 and listed on the National Register of Historic Places in 1972. Registered Site #: Local Site #0114

History
In 1871, 22 people began Ovid's First Congregational Church with minister Reverend William Mulder. The next year, the congregation hired master carpenter George Fox to construct this building at the corner of High and Park Streets. In 1876, a bell was installed in the belfry. In 1899, with a growing congregation, the structure was moved to its current location and enlarged, adding a basement and two porticoes. In 1843, the Congregational and Methodist churches merged, using both buildings until 1972. In 1979, this church became a private residence.

Description
The First Congregational Church of Ovid is a frame Gothic Revival structure, in a modified T-plan. It has a gable roof and clapboard-covered walls with pilaster strips at the corners. Gothic elements include tall, narrow arch-top windows and a rose window.

References

Churches on the National Register of Historic Places in Michigan
Carpenter Gothic church buildings in Michigan
Churches completed in 1871
Michigan State Historic Sites
Congregational churches in Michigan
National Register of Historic Places in Clinton County, Michigan
19th-century churches in the United States
1871 establishments in Michigan
Wooden churches in Michigan